Boca Ciega Bay is a body of water connected to the Gulf of Mexico on the west-central coast of Florida. It is bordered by Gulfport, St. Petersburg, and other municipalities in Pinellas County. Clam Bayou estuary feeds into the bay.

Boca Ciega Bay is an aquatic preserve designated in 1968 to halt dredging-and-filling work done in the 1950s. There are mangrove islands as well as miles of canals bounded by seawalls.

Along with the Pinellas County Aquatic Preserve, Boca Ciega Bay provides sandy beaches, mangrove shoreline and submerged habitats such as oyster bars, seagrass beds, coral habitat, and spring-fed caves.

Boca Ciega Bay Boaters Guide can be found here: https://www.tampabay.wateratlas.usf.edu/upload/documents/BocaCiegaBay_web.pdf

The 185-acre Boca Ciega Millennium Park in Seminole, Florida, is a protected natural area and preserve. The park features a 35-foot wooden observation tower with a panoramic view of Boca Ciega Bay. The park is a stop on the Florida Fish and Wildlife Conservation Commission's "Great Florida Birding Trail."

Archaeological digs show that the eastern shore of the bay was inhabited by prehistoric native Americans, in particular during the late Weeden Island  and Safety Harbor periods, from roughly 800 A.D. to 1700 A.D. Some also believe that the area was visited as early as 1528 by the Spanish explorer Pánfilo de Narváez.

See also
Intracoastal Waterway

References

Bays of Florida on the Gulf of Mexico
Bodies of water of Pinellas County, Florida
Protected areas of Pinellas County, Florida